The Fore River Bridge spans the Weymouth Fore River between Quincy and Weymouth, Massachusetts.

History

A bascule bridge was built in 1936, replacing an earlier span. The bascule bridge was demolished in 2004 as it was considered structurally deficient and unsafe.

The temporary bridge remained in place until the new bridge was completed in 2018. This will help reduce the number of openings during the busy summer months.

The Fore River Bridge was built at an approximate cost of $272 million and construction lasted 6 years with final completion in 2018. A portion of the temporary bridge was donated for use as a short bridge over a river in Perches, Haiti.

See also
List of bridges documented by the Historic American Engineering Record in Massachusetts

References

External links

Fore River Bridge Replacement Project website - MassDOT

Bridges in Norfolk County, Massachusetts
Historic American Engineering Record in Massachusetts
Vertical lift bridges in Massachusetts
Quincy, Massachusetts
Weymouth, Massachusetts
Road bridges in Massachusetts